Will Skuse (born 14 February 1992 in Truro, England) is an English professional rugby union footballer. He plays at flanker for Bath.

References

External links

Premiership Rugby Profile
European Professional Club Rugby Profile
Bath Rugby Profile

1992 births
Living people
Bath Rugby players
English rugby union players
People educated at Bryanston School
Rugby union players from Truro
Rugby union flankers